Yerukala or Erukala or Erukula is a Tamil tribal community primarily found in Andhra Pradesh and Telangana.
The population of Yerukala tribes according to 2011 census is 519,337. The total literacy rate among Yerukula is 48.12%. Most live in southern coastal Andhra and Rayalaseema, with a smaller minority in districts of Telangana. Their native language is Tamil based Yerukala but most have shifted to Telugu. They were vilifed in British sources for being habitual criminals, and so were placed under Criminal Tribes Act, although they were underrepresented in the population of criminals and were most likely targeted for their nomadic lifestyle.

References and notes

External links
Yerukalas Home Page
Mudiraju Kings
Ekalavya Tribal Development and Educational Society page on Yerukula

Indian castes
Dravidian peoples
Telugu society
Scheduled Tribes of India
Ethnic groups in India
Social groups of Andhra Pradesh
Social groups of Telangana
Tribal communities of Andhra Pradesh
Denotified tribes of India